Piz Sella is a mountain in the Bernina Range of the Alps, located on the border between Italy and Switzerland. It lies between Piz Glüschaint and Piz Roseg, south of the Roseg Glacier.

References

External links
 Piz Sella on Hikr

Bernina Range
Mountains of Graubünden
Mountains of Lombardy
Mountains of the Alps
Alpine three-thousanders
International mountains of Europe
Italy–Switzerland border
Mountains of Switzerland
Samedan